The Hogan Cup, also known as the All-Ireland Post Primary Schools Senior A Football Championship, is the top level Gaelic football championship for secondary schools (sometimes referred to as colleges) in Ireland. The competition itself is regularly referred to by the trophy's name.

The 2023 champions are Omagh CBS, who won the cup for the second time by defeating Summerhill College in the final.

St Jarlath's College, Tuam hold the record number of titles, winning their twelfth in 2002, and have appeared as runners-up in a further fourteen finals.

The competition commenced in 1946 but was not played in the years 1949 to 1956. The cup is named after Brother Thomas Hogan. The Hogan Stand in Croke Park is named after his brother Michael Hogan. Since its beginning, there have been three different cups presented. The original cup was last presented in 1960, and now resides in St Jarlath's College. A newly designed cup was introduced in 1961. This cup itself was replaced in 2014 with a new design.

To increase participation the Colleges All-Ireland senior "B" championship (holders Holy Trinity College Cookstown) was created in 1975, and a senior "C" championship commenced in 2000.

Format
 Provincial Championships
The four provinces each organise an A championship —
 Connacht Colleges Senior Football Championship
 Leinster Colleges Senior Football Championship
 Munster Colleges Senior Football Championship (Corn Uí Mhuirí)
 Ulster Colleges Senior Football Championship (MacRory Cup)

 All-Ireland
The four provincial "A" champions compete in two knock-out semi-finals. The final is usually played in mid-April.

Wins listed by college

Finals listed by year

Wins listed by Province

Sources

References

All-Ireland Football Championships
Gaelic football cup competitions